Marjan Čakarun (born April 27, 1990) is a Croatian professional basketball player for BC Körmend of the Hungarian Basketball League. He is a 2.04 m tall center.

Career
Čakarun signed with Helios Suns in 2015 after playing with Kvarner 2010.

Čakarun signed a two-year contract with Primorska in 2019. He led Primorska to the 2019 Slovenian Cup and was the leading scorer in the final with 32 points.

References

External links
 Eurobasket.com profile
 Fiba Profile

1990 births
Living people
Basketball players from Zadar
Bàsquet Manresa players
Centers (basketball)
Croatian expatriate basketball people in Spain
Croatian expatriate sportspeople in Hungary
Croatian expatriate sportspeople in Slovenia
Croatian men's basketball players
KK Borik Puntamika players
KK Kvarner 2010 players
KK Zadar players
Liga ACB players
Szolnoki Olaj KK players
Helios Suns players